Javier Abril Espinoza (born 1967) is a Honduran writer based in Switzerland. He writes for the newspaper The Herald of Honduras and collaborates with various literary magazines from Latin America. 

In 1996, he won the Pablo Neruda Prize for his poetry collection De aquí en adelante... [from now on...] (1996 - UPNH), and the Mari Paz Ovidi Premio Internacional de Cuentos [Mari Paz Ovidi International Short Story Prize], organized by the Australian publishing house Terra Austral, in 2005.

Published books: Cuentos para niños y niñas [stories for little boys and little girls] (Children's Stories Collection - UNICEF); El doblez de los espejos [the fold in the mirrors] (poetry); and Un ángel atrapado en el huracán [an angel trapped in the hurricane] (Topicornio Publishing), a story book that deals with the natural disasters caused by hurricanes in Central America and the Caribbean, and portrays, through its characters and situations, the unfavourable human conditions experienced by the people of that region, with or without such natural tragedies, and the subsequent abandonment by Central American governments. 

As well as producing novels and short stories, Abril Espinoza is also a playwright and scriptwriter. Several of his literary works and essays have been translated into some of the official languages of the European Union. He is one of Central America's more notable young writers.

Bibliography
 Un ángel atrapado en el huracán [Tegucigalpa, Honduras?]: Editorial Tropicornio de Centroamérica, 2002.

References

External links
Sololiteratura.com
Bibliotecaquijosteca.com

Honduran male writers
Living people
1967 births